Caldey Island (Welsh:Ynys Bŷr) is a small island near Tenby, Pembrokeshire, Wales, less than  off the coast. With a recorded history going back over 1,500 years, it is one of the holy islands of Britain. A number of traditions inherited from Celtic times are observed by the Cistercian monks of Caldey Abbey, the owners of the island.

The island's population consists of about 40 permanent residents and a varying number of Cistercian monks, known as Trappists. The monks' predecessors migrated there from Belgium in the early 20th century, taking over from Anglican Benedictines who had bought the island in 1906 and built the extant monastery and abbey but later got into financial difficulties. Today, the monks of Caldey Abbey rely on tourism and making perfumes and chocolate.

The usual access to the island is by boat from Tenby,  to the north. In the spring and summer, visitors are ferried to Caldey, not only to visit the sacred sanctuary but also to view the island's rich wildlife. Following a rat eradication programme, red squirrels were introduced in 2016. Alongside rare breed sheep and cattle, the island has a diverse bird and plant life.

Name origins 
The island was named Ynys Bŷr after Saint Pyr, the sixth century saint, and Pyr is named as abbot of the monastery around the year 500 in the Life of St Samson. This Welsh name has remained in use since medieval times, but the Old Welsh name of the island before St Pyr's day is unknown.

Like those of many Welsh islands, Caldey's English name (sometimes spelled Caldy) derives from the Vikings. Kald ey translates as "cold island", with the name appearing as 'Caldea' in the early 12th century, and Kaldey or Caldey by 1291.

History

Pre-history

Three caves have been discovered on the island and excavated to unearth archaeological finds: Nanna's Cave, Potter's Cave (1950) and Ogof–yr-Ychen ("Ox cave", 1970). In Nanna's Cave, human bones and shells were first found in 1911 and excavations continued in three more stages until the 1970s. Potter's Cave was found in 1950 by a monk named James Van Nedervelde, and excavations, which continued until 1970, initially revealed stalagmites in which tools and animals were embedded. After removal of these finds, three human skeletons were found and carbon dated: two were dated to the Middle Stone Age and one to the Romano–British period. Also found were a few artefacts from the late Upper Paleolithic period. In Ogof–yr-Ychen, the bones of humans whose burials date between 7590 BC and 5710 BC were found. Stable isotope ratio tests revealed that they lived on marine food. A very few earlier neolithic bowls and shells have also been found in the caves. All the finds were carbon dated and have been preserved in the Abbey of Caldey Island or in Tenby Museum and Art Gallery.

Recorded history

A Celtic monastery was first established on the island in the sixth century, and the island thrived during the Middle Ages. Following the Norman Conquest, Robert fitz Martin, Lord of Cemais, gave the island to his mother Geva. In the 12th century, Caldey Priory (now a Grade I listed building) was established by Tironensian monks as a daughter house of St. Dogmaels Abbey, and lasted to the Dissolution of the Monasteries in 1536.

The north side of Caldey Island is made up of grey limestone, a desirable building material. The 19th century seems to have been the height of limestone quarrying on the island; some of the limestone was taken to the Annery kiln in the district of Torridge in north Devon for processing.

The current abbey was built in 1910 by Anglican Benedictine monks but financial problems beginning in 1925 led to the 1929 purchase of the property by Belgian Cistercians. It is considered to be the most complete example of the Arts and Crafts style in the country, and was the largest project of John Coates Carter. At the time of building, the abbey was called "the greatest phenomenon in the Anglican community at the present time". The roofs are of white roughcast with red tiling, and the abbey church has five side-windows and on the south a "tapering" tower with primitive crenellations.

Caldey Island and Little Caldey Island have together formed an ecclesiastical district for as long as the locals can remember, with 20 Cistercian monks living at the monastery . The Census Reports of the County of Pembroke record it as an ecclesiastical district for administrative purposes.

The Caldey Island Act 1990 added the island to Dyfed and South Pembrokeshire, and to Pembrokeshire parliamentary constituency.

Geography 
It is separated from the mainland by Caldey Sound. A ferry service from Tenby goes to Caldey Island in the spring and summer months when the weather allows. Boats depart every half hour from the harbour at high tide, while at low tide they depart from Castle Beach.

Caldey Island consists of two islands which are separated at high tide: Caldey Island and Little Caldey Island. Little Caldey Island is also known as St Margaret's Island or St Margaret's Isle, and lies off the north-western point of Caldey Island. It acquired its name in the 17th century, and is known for its seals and bird sanctuary.

The island is mostly used for grazing.

Climate
The average high and low temperatures for Caldey Island, along with wind speeds for each month of the year, are given in the following table.

Wildlife
Caldey Island is known for its flowers, many of which are rarely found in other areas of the United Kingdom. The island also has many species of birds that are prevalent in the summer months. The country's largest colony of cormorants is located at St Margaret's Island. Following a two-year rat eradication programme, red squirrels were introduced in 2016 and by 2018 were breeding successfully.

Economy and services

The island's economic activity is supported by tourism and the sale of perfumes and chocolate. The main income comes from tourism. The monastery opened an Internet shop in 2001 to sell products online. Their lavender perfume is said to be "simply the best lavender soliflore on earth" by the perfume critic Luca Turin.

Caldey Island provides a spiritual retreat that accommodates up to 750 guests a year. The island has a functioning post office including a museum of the island's history. The island has its own postage stamps and its own monetary unit named after the local fish, the dab. There is a colonial-style tea shop on the green, and an underground reservoir near the lighthouse, supplied by a spring. This provides water to the gardens and the people.

For handling emergencies, the island Land Rover is shared between the fire service, the coastguard, and the police. There is a volunteer fire service operated by the Mid and West Wales Fire and Rescue Service, with access to two fire engines, one being a 4x4 rural firefighting unit airlifted to the island by the Royal Air Force. The last reported major fire on the island was in 1940 when the monastery was damaged.

Landmarks 

Tourist attractions on Caldey Island include the recently restored 13th-century church of St Illtyd, an ogham cross from the sixth century, a Norman chapel, and Caldey Abbey, completed in 1910.

Caldey Lighthouse was built in 1828. The light was intended to help coastal traffic trading limestone and coal to mid- and North Wales but the light also helped long-distance and North American traffic identify the Bristol Channel and avoid confusion with the English Channel. The light stands 64 m (210 ft) above high-water mark. The lighthouse was automated in 1929. The former oil store for the lighthouse is a listed structure. The lighthouse keeper's  cottages that flank the lighthouse are two-storey, with hipped roofs, octagonal chimneys and a one-storey linking corridor. The cottages were built around 1868–70 by T. C. Harvey.

References

Bibliography

External links

 Official Caldey Island website
 RCAHMW/Coflein listings
 St Illtud's Church and Caldey Ogham Stone
 The monks installed a television set as a 'one-off' to watch the funeral of Pope John Paul II
Photos of Caldey Island and surrounding area on geograph.org.uk
https://www.caldeyislandsurvivors.org/petition P-05-954 Petition for a public inquiry by the Welsh Government into the historic child abuse on Caldey Island, Correspondence – Petition Coordinator to Committee, 22.10.21.

Islands of Pembrokeshire
Carmarthen Bay
Islands of the Bristol Channel
Private islands of the United Kingdom